Dario De Luca (born 26 July 1956, in Potenza) is an Italian politician.

He is a member of the right-wing party Brothers of Italy. He was elected Mayor of Potenza on 8 June 2014 and took office on 23 June.

See also
2014 Italian local elections
List of mayors of Potenza

References

External links
 
 

1956 births
Living people
Mayors of Potenza
Brothers of Italy politicians